The Triumph Gloria is a car which was produced by the Triumph Motor Company in Coventry, England, from 1934 to 1938.

History
Between 1934 and 1938 Triumph made a large and complex range of Gloria sporting saloons, coupés, tourers, 2-seater sports cars, drophead coupés and golfer’s coupés. All these Glorias, apart from the final two models (1.5-Litre Saloon and Fourteen (1767 cc) Six-Light Saloon of 1937-1938) were powered by 1087 or 1232 cc four-cylinder or 1467 or 1991 cc six-cylinder Coventry Climax overhead inlet and side exhaust valve designed engines (modified and built under licence by Triumph). 

The chassis came in two lengths, with an extra  ahead of the passenger compartment depending on whether the four- or six-cylinder engine was fitted, and had conventional non-independent suspension with semi elliptic leaf springs.  The brakes were hydraulically operated using the Lockheed system with large  drums. A four-speed transmission was fitted with an optional free wheel mechanism allowing "clutchless" gear changing. Synchromesh was fitted to the gearbox on the final Fourteen and 1.5-litre models.

Gloria Vitesse
From August 1934 to 1936 the Gloria range included ‘Gloria Vitesse’ models (not to be confused with later Vitesses) which were up-rated, with twin carburettor engine and equipment, versions of the equivalent Gloria and slightly different bodywork in the case of some saloons.

Gloria Southern Cross

There was also from 1934 to 1937 an open two-seat sporting model, the Southern Cross, re-using the name previously applied to the sports version of the Triumph Super 9.

Scale models and die-cast models

Lansdowne Models introduced a model of the 1935/6 Gloria Vitesse Sports Saloon in 2008.

References 

Pre-1940 Triumph Owners Club website

Gloria
1930s cars
Cars introduced in 1934